Denby is an unincorporated community in Oglala Lakota County, in the U.S. state of South Dakota.

History
A post office called Denby was established in 1922, and remained in operation until 1985. The community was named for Edwin Denby, 42nd United States Secretary of the Navy.

References

Unincorporated communities in Oglala Lakota County, South Dakota
Unincorporated communities in South Dakota